Pedro Rodriguez may refer to:

Sports
 Pedro Rodríguez (athlete), Cuban shot putter who won in the Athletics at the 1926 Central American and Caribbean Games
 Pedro Rodríguez (racing driver) (1940–1971), Mexican racing driver
 Pedro Rodríguez (cyclist, born 1950), Cuban cyclist
 Pedro Rodríguez (water polo), Cuban water polo player who played Water polo at the 1980 Summer Olympics
 Pedro Rodríguez (cyclist, born 1966), Ecuadorian cyclist
 Pedro Rodríguez (weightlifter), Cuban weightlifter who won in the Weightlifting at the 1991 Pan American Games
 Pedro Eliezer Rodríguez Ledesma (born 1987), Spanish footballer, played for Barcelona and Chelsea
 Pedro Rodríguez (motorcycle racer) (born 1994), Spanish Grand Prix motorcycle racer
 Pedro Rodríguez (cyclist, born 1994), Ecuadorian cyclist at the 2013 UCI Road World Championship

Other people
 Pedro Rodríguez (cardinal) (died 1310), bishop of Burgos
 Pedro Rodriguez de Miranda (1696–1766), Spanish painter of the late-Baroque period
 Pedro Rodríguez, Count of Campomanes (1723–1802), Spanish statesman and writer
 Pedro Rodríguez (politician) (1869–1932), Philippine politician
 Pedro Jesús Rodríguez (1907–1982), Chilean lawyer, academic and politician
 Pedro Rodríguez (soldier) (1912–1999), Puerto Rican Korean War hero who won two Silver Star Medals
 Pedro Rodriguez (scientist) (born 1953), Puerto Rican scientist and inventor in NASA
 Pedro A. Rodríguez (born 1968), PPD member of the 15th Legislative Assembly of Puerto Rico
 Pedro Rodriguez (theologian) (fl. 1980s–1990s), Spanish theologian
 Pedro Rodríguez (Paraguayan politician), president of the Chamber of Deputies of Paraguay 2017–2018

Other uses
 Pedro-Rodríguez, a municipality in the province of Ávila, Castile and León, Spain
 Pedro Rodrigues Filho, a prolific serial killer

Rodriguez, Pedro